Turhan Hatice Sultan ("mercyful" or "noble";  1627 – 4 August 1683) was the first Haseki Sultan of the Ottoman Sultan Ibrahim (reign 1640–48) and Valide sultan as the mother of Mehmed IV (reign 1648–87). Turhan was prominent for the regency of her young son and her building patronage. She and her mother-in-law, Kösem Sultan, are the only two women in Ottoman history to be regarded as official regents and had supreme control over the Ottoman Empire. As a result, Turhan became one of the prominent figures during the era known as Sultanate of Women.

As imperial consort 
Of Rus' origin, Turhan Hatice Sultan, was born in 1627 in Russia. She was captured in one of the raids of the Tatars and sold into slavery. She was sent to the Imperial Harem at the Topkapı Palace from the Khan of Crimea. She was presented to the palace, as a gift of Kör Süleyman Pasha to Kösem Sultan. She was trained by Atike Sultan, daughter of Sultan Ahmed I, and groomed by Kösem, who 
presented her to her son, Ibrahim. She had one brother, Yunus Agha (died 1689), living in Istanbul. According to Sakaoğlu, she was tall, delicate, had blue eyes and was white skinned.

Turhan gave birth to one child, Şehzade Mehmed (future Sultan Mehmed IV) born on 2 January 1642.  Mehmed's birth caused great rejoicing both within and outside the palace. Although, she bore the sultan his first son, she was largely ignored by him. Her daily stipend as the haseki consisted of 1000 aspers. 

At one point Ibrahim took a great liking to the infant son of a slave woman, to the extent of preferring the unrelated child to his son Mehmed. Turhan grew extremely jealous and vented her anger to Ibrahim, who flew into a rage and grabbed Mehmed from Turhan's arms and threw him into a pool. Mehmed would have drowned if a servant had not rescued him. He was left with a permanent scar on his forehead.

As Valide Sultan

Mehmed's accession 
Ibrahim's behaviour sparked talks of deposing the sultan. On 8 August 1648, Ibrahim was dethroned and several days later he was strangled. At the head of the Ottoman Empire stood the child sultan, Mehmed IV. With Mehmed's ascendancy, the position of Valide Sultan ("mother of the reigning sultan") should have gone to Turhan. However, Turhan was overlooked due to her youth and inexperience. Instead, the sultan's grandmother and the previous Valide sultan, Kösem Sultan, was reinstated to this high position. Kösem Sultan was a Valide (mother) under two sons, thus having the more experience of the  two women.

However, Turhan turned out to be too ambitious a woman to lose such a high position without a fight. In her struggle to become Valide sultan, Turhan was supported by the chief black eunuch in her household and the grand vizier, while Kösem was supported by the Janissary Corps. Although, Kösem's position as Valide was seen as the best for the government, the people resented the influence of the Janissaries on the government.

In this power struggle, Kösem planned to dethrone Mehmed and replace him with another young grandson. According to one historian, this switching had more to do with replacing an ambitious daughter-in-law with one who was more easily controlled. The plan was unsuccessful as it was reported to Turhan by Meleki Hatun, one of Kösem's slaves. As N.M. Penzer describes it:

Whether Turhan sanctioned it or not, on the night of 2
September 1651, Kösem Sultan was murdered three years after becoming regent for her young grandson.

As regent 
With the death of her rival, Turhan became the Valide Sultan. As a regent, Turhan wielded great power. She accompanied her son the sultan to important meetings and on several occasions spoke from behind her curtained sitting place. She was deeply loved and respected by her son, the sultan. Due to her inexperience, Turhan relied on other members of the government to advise her on political matters. This is evident from her correspondence to the grand viziers.

Turhan's regency was marred by at least two factors: the war with the Venetians for the island of Crete, and the financial crisis that arose from the high expenses of waging war. Weak grand viziers did not improve the situation. However, in 1656 Köprülü Mehmed Pasha was appointed to the position of grand vizier. His condition upon accepting the post was that he be given greater authority than his predecessors. Thus, Turhan transferred her political power to that of the grand vizier.

In 1657, During the long-term residence of Mehmed in Edirne due to the expeditions, Turhan Sultan was with him.  During the short-term departure of Edirne, one of the viziers was appointed to supervise the sultan.  She traveled to Istanbul from time to time while her son was on a long trip.  It is known that a few years after the commencement of the round trips to Edirne, she built a flat (Avcı Sultan Mehmed Khan Apartment / Dolmabahçe Pavilion) in her palace in 1661.  Turhan Sultan went to Babadağı with her son, who left Edirne and moved in the direction of Kamaniçe with a ceremony on 5 June 1672 for the Polish expedition.

The army decided to stay here until he returned from the expedition, and one of the dome viziers, İbrâhim Pasha, was commissioned with the guard.  Meanwhile, her grandson Şehzade Mustafa (later Mustafa II), who was eight years old, was with her.  However, her residence in Babadağı did not last until the return of the army.  When the army arrived at Edirne, Turhan Sultan was in Istanbul.  Mehmed sent the second vizier Mustafa Pasha to Istanbul to bring his mother before a week passed.

Gülnuş Sultan attempted to have her husband's brothers Suleiman II and Ahmed II strangled after she gave birth to her firstborn Mustafa, but Turhan had hindered these attempted murders.

Patronage 
By providing the grand vizier with great authority, Turhan limited her own power on the political stage. However, she channeled her energies into other architectural projects.
 
She built a fountain in 1653 in Beşiktaş district. Her first building project began in 1658. Perhaps in answer to the Venetian threat, the Valide built two fortresses at the entrance to the Dardanelles. The fortresses, one on the European side and the other on the Asian side, can still be seen today. Mehmed the Conqueror and other sultans also built fortresses in the same area. Each of the fortresses contained of a mosque, elementary schools,  hamams and bazaars. Turhan had built wells in Hejaz, she also constructed a library in Çanakkale and Istanbul.
 
Turhan also built the Yeni Mosque in Istanbul. The initial construction was started by one of Turhan's predecessors, Safiye Sultan. She had chosen the commercial quarter of the city, Eminonü, as the location of the mosque. This area was inhabited by non-Muslims. By building a new mosque in Eminönü, Safiye wanted to Islamize the area.To build on this site meant that land had to be appropriated from the local non-Muslim residents, an act that had not gone smoothly. In the year 1597, the first stones were laid. At the death of Safiye's son, Mehmed III, the construction of the mosque stopped as she was no longer the Valide. The construction was abandoned for 57 years, but was restarted after the area was devastated by the Great Fire of 1660. Turhan decided to complete what had been started by Safiye Sultan. After its completion in 1665, the complex contained not only the mosque, but also a school, public fountains, a market, and a tomb. The Yeni Mosque was the first imperial mosque built by a woman. On 31 October 1665, the mosque was opened and Turhan Sultan and Sultan Mehmed IV's consort Gülnuş Sultan attended the first prayer in the mosque.

In the southeast corner of the mosque, there is a need to pass to the majestic ruin and the sultan pavilion is arranged in three floors.  The lower and middle floor cut-top stone has upper-level stone and brick walls that do not meet the needs of the brick.  The pavilion, which is entered through a low arch door, has a long and ramped path.  The palace, which has a long vaulted corridor underneath, is located on the upper floor, which is reserved for the sultan and the sultan, together with two hearth rooms.  After the “L” shaped hall and an intermediate space, the balcony in front of the building passes to the building.  The walls in the Hünkâr pavilion are covered with herbal decorated tile panels in under-glaze technique.

Turhan was the last woman to wield such great power as to act as a regent to a young son. As women were not seen in public in the Ottoman Empire, it was through her patronage of building that Turhan showed herself to her subjects

Turhan Sultan, Mehmed IV, Mustafa II, Ahmed III, Mahmud I and total of forty-four people are buried especially some people from Osman and his family.  In the direction of the mausoleum of the tomb, a treasure was formed in the courtyard over time, so fountains and power windows were built on the courtyard wall.

Death 
Turhan Sultan died on 4 August 1683 in Edirne. She lies alongside her son and her descendants. She was considered the last of the great valide sultans. Her death marked the end of the period known as the Sultanate of Women.

Issue
From Ibrahim I, Turhan had a certain son: 
 Mehmed IV (January 2, 1642, Topkapi Palace, Constantinople - January 6, 1693, Edirne Palace, Edirne). He became sultan six years after his father was deposed and killed. 

In addition to Mehmed, several historians speculate that Turhan may have been the mother of at least one daughter.  

They have been proposed as daughters of Turhan: 
 Fatma Sultan (between September and December 1642, Topkapi Palace, Constantinople - 1657, Constantinople). Turhan Sultan took care of her tomb.
 Beyhan Sultan (1645, Topkapi Palace, Constantinople - September 15, 1700)  
 Atike Sultan (?, Topkapi Palace, Constantinople - 1665?, Constantinople). Turhan may have named her in honor of Atike Sultan, Ibrahim's sister who educated and cared for her as a her own daughter.

Gallery

In popular culture
In 2015, Turkish historical fiction TV series Muhteşem Yüzyıl: Kösem, Turhan is portrayed by Turkish actress Hande Doğandemir. In the series, she is the mother of Mehmed IV and Beyhan Sultan.

See also 

Çınar Incident
Ottoman dynasty
Ottoman family tree
List of Valide Sultans
List of consorts of the Ottoman Sultans
Sultanate of Women

References

Sources 

1630 births
1683 deaths
17th-century consorts of Ottoman sultans
17th-century women rulers
Ruthenian people
Kidnapped Turkish people
Missing person cases in Turkey
Female regents
Turhan
Valide sultan